The Limacoidei is a taxonomic infraorder of air-breathing land snails, semislugs and slugs, terrestrial pulmonate gastropod molluscs in the suborder Helicina

Distribution 
The original ancestral area of limacoid families is thought to be the Palearctic region and south-eastern Asia.

Etymology 
The word "limacoid" means "resembling a slug".

Typography of the name 
In 1998, for the same taxon, Hausdorf used the name Limacoidea sensu lato.

The name of this taxon, the limacoid clade, was written by Bouchet & Rocroi (2005) with quotation marks like this: "limacoid clade".

Other typographical variants are used by various other authors, for example capitalizing and restricting the use of the quote marks thus: "Limacoid" clade and "Limacoid clade".

2003 taxonomy by Schileyko 
The study of A. Schileyko in this group, published in parts 8–11 of his monograph between 2002 and 2003, did not discuss the system that Hausdorf had proposed. However, Schileyko refers to the work of Hausdorf, where this system was proposed, in part 10 (2003) on p. 1390. So he was acquainted with this system before 2003.

Alternative taxonomy is as follows (subfamilies listed only for Helicarionidae and Zonitidae):
Superfamily Helicarionoidea
Family Euconulidae
Family Trochomorphidae
Family Helicarionidae
Subfamily Geotrochinae
Subfamily Helicarioninae
Subfamily Papuarioninae
Subfamily Urocyclinae
Family Gymnarionidae
Family Rhysotinidae
Family Ariophantidae
Family Ostracolethidae
Family Ryssotidae
Family Milacidae
Superfamily Dyakioidea
Family Dyakiidae
Family Staffordiidae
Superfamily Gastrodontoidea
Family Gastrodontidae
Superfamily Zonitoidea
Family Zonitidae
Subfamily Pristilomatinae
Subfamily Godwiniinae
Subfamily Zonitinae
Subfamily Oxychilinae
Family Daudebardiidae
Family Parmacellidae
Superfamily Trigonochlamydoidea
Family Trigonochlamydidae
Superfamily Vitrinoidea
Family Vitrinidae
Superfamily Limacoidea
Family Limacidae
Family Agriolimacidae
Family Boettgerillidae

Moreover, after these groups, in the same infraorder Limacoinei, Schileyko listed six more superfamilies: Camaenoidea, Xanthonychoidea, Helicoidea, Polygyroidea, Hygromioidea and Arionoidea.

2005 taxonomy by Bouchet & Rocroi

Explanatory note
For this particular group of families, Bouchet & Rocroi adapted the taxonomic approach which was originally published by German malacologist Bernhard Hausdorf in 1998 in the Journal of Molluscan Studies. Bouchet & Rocroi clearly state, on p. 283:

However, in their paper, Bouchet & Rocroi (apparently accidentally) failed to show, graphically or typographically, any coverage of the limacoid clade in the taxonomic section of their paper, on pp. 268–269.

Because of this omission, some authors have subsequently (mistakenly) included in the "limacoid clade" the two following superfamilies: Arionoidea and Helicoidea. This misunderstanding was copied by Poppe & Tagaro (2006) who attempted to explain the changes within this taxonomy to the public. This same error is reproduced in various other internet sources.

Taxonomic list
The taxonomy of Bouchet and Rocroi shows the "limacoid clade" as follows:

(Families that are exclusively fossil are indicated with a dagger †)

Superfamily Staffordioidea
Family Staffordiidae
Superfamily Dyakioidea
Family Dyakiidae
Superfamily Gastrodontoidea
Family Gastrodontidae
Family Chronidae
Family Euconulidae
Family Oxychilidae
Family Pristilomatidae
Family Trochomorphidae
Fossil taxa probably belonging to the Gastrodontoidea
Subfamily † Archaeozonitinae
Subfamily † Grandipatulinae
Subfamily † Palaeoxestininae
Superfamily Parmacelloidea
Family Parmacellidae
Family Milacidae
Family Trigonochlamydidae
Superfamily Zonitoidea
Family Zonitidae
Superfamily Helicarionoidea
Family Helicarionidae
Family Ariophantidae
Family Urocyclidae
Superfamily Limacoidea
Family Limacidae
Family Agriolimacidae
Family Boettgerillidae
Family Vitrinidae

Cladogram 
A cladogram showing phylogenic relations of families in the limacoid clade:

As explained in the previous section, the superfamilies Arionoidea and Helicoidea do not belong to the limacoid clade. However, they are sometimes mistakenly included in this taxon.

References

 Bouchet P., Rocroi J.P., Hausdorf B., Kaim A., Kano Y., Nützel A., Parkhaev P., Schrödl M. & Strong E.E. (2017). Revised classification, nomenclator and typification of gastropod and monoplacophoran families. Malacologia. 61(1-2): 1-526

Stylommatophora